Dum Dum Junction is a  Kolkata Suburban Railway junction station on the Sealdah–Ranaghat line. The Dum Dum metro station is adjacent to Dum Dum railway station. It serves Dum Dum and the surrounding areas.

History
The Calcutta Sealdah–Kusthia line of Eastern Bengal Railway was opened to traffic in 1862. Eastern Bengal Railway worked on the eastern side of the Hooghly River, which in those days there was no bridge.

In 1882–84 the Bengal Central Railway Company constructed two lines: one from Dum Dum to Khulna present day which is in Bangladesh, via Bangaon and the other linking Ranaghat and Bangaon. The Bengal Central Railway was formed in 1881 to construct and operate a line to Khulna. Later, it was merged with Eastern Bengal Railway in 1903.

Electrification
The Sealdah–Ranaghat line and the Dum Dum–Barasat–Ashok Nagar–Bangaon line were electrified in 1963–64. Further, the Dum Dum–Dankuni sector was electrified in 1964–65.

Platforms

Platform 1
Platform 1 mostly handles trains in the Up Sealdah Main Line sections. It also handles a few trains in the Up Sealdah-Dankuni chord line, Sealdah-Baruipara local, Sealdah-Bangaon section.

Platform 2
Platform 2 only handles Down Sealdah bound trains in the Sealdah-Main Line section and almost all trains from Dankuni and Baruipara and a few from the Bangaon-Sealdah section.

Platform 3
Platform 3 mostly handles Up train in the Sealdah-Dankuni chord line section, Sealdah-Baruipara local, the Sealdah-Bangaon section, Kolkata-Lalgola MEMU and Sealdah-Lalgola Passenger and MEMU trains. It also handles a few trains in the Up Sealdah-Main Line section and trains coming from Budge Budge, Majerhat through Ballygunge Junction.

Platform 4
Platform 4 mostly handles trains in the Sealdah bound trains in the Bangaon-Sealdah section. It also handles a few Dankuni-Sealdah trains and also handles trains from Majerhat and Ballygunge through Princep Ghat joining the Sealdah-Main Line section(and sometimes the reverse route too) and down passengers trains coming from Lalgola.

Platform 5
It mostly handles trains coming from or going to Princep Ghat, although Princep Ghat is not the terminus for trains passing through this platform. The Bangaon-Canning local also stops by this platform.

Passengers

Dum Dum railway station handles 576,000 passengers daily.

Connections

Train 
Being an important railway junction station in the Sealdah Division of the Eastern Railways, Dum Dum Junction serves as an important halt to many long-distance trains like-

 Sealdah–Muzaffarpur Fast Passenger (Up 53131 / Dn 53132)
 Sealdah–Lalgola Passenger (Up 53171,  53175, 53179,53181, 63105 / Dn 53172, 53176, 53180, 53182, 53186, 63106)
 Sealdah–Jangipur DEMU (Up 73151/ Dn 73152)
 Sealdah–Rampurhat MEMU (Up 63141 / Dn 63142) etc.

Metro 
It is connected with Dum Dum metro station of Kolkata Metro Line 1 . The metro station is connected through subways.

Auto 
Dumdum station-Nagerbazar, Dumdum station-Chiriamore, Dumdum Station- RG Kar Hospital, Dumdum station-30A bus-stand and Dumdum Station-Sinthee More autos ply on this route.

Buses 
Bus route number 30B, 30B/1, 202, 219/1, DN9/1, S168 (Mini), E19D, S10, 11A, AC38 by Dum Dum Road serve the station.

Air 
Netaji Subhas Chandra Bose International Airport is connected via Dum Dum Rd and Jessore Rd; distance between Dumdum junction and the airport is 5.6 km.

References

External links

 Long distance trains at Dum Dum
Sealdah-Dum Dum trains
Dum Dum-Sealdah trains
Dum Dum-Lalgola trains
Dum Dum-Bangaon trains
Dum Dum-Dankuni trains
 

Railway stations in North 24 Parganas district
Sealdah railway division
Kolkata Suburban Railway stations
1862 establishments in India
Airport railway stations in India
Railway junction stations in West Bengal
Kolkata Circular Railway